Charley M. Thomas (born April 4, 1986 in Victoria, British Columbia) is a Canadian curler from Calgary who currently skips his own rink on the World Curling Tour.

Curling career 
Thomas started his career with an Alberta Provincial Junior title in 2004 and made his debut on the national and international curling scene representing Alberta and winning the 2006 Canadian Junior Curling Championships (Thunder Bay, Ontario) and 2006 World Junior Curling Championships (Jeonju, Korea). Thomas and team also qualified for the 2007 Canadian Junior Curling Championships by winning the 2007 Alberta Junior Provincials at the Granite Curling Club in Edmonton, Alberta. He went on to win his second straight Canadian Junior title over Brett Gallant's rink from Prince Edward Island, as well as a consecutive World Junior title by defeating Niklas Edin of Sweden.

After juniors, Thomas skipped his own team before teaming up with Chris Schille in 2008, throwing fourth stones for the team. Thomas played one season with Schille. Thomas returned to skipping between 2010 and 2014, and joined the Virtue rink for the 2014-15 season.

Thomas and teammate Kalynn Park won the 2015 Canadian Mixed Doubles Curling Trials and represented Canada at the 2015 World Mixed Doubles Curling Championship to a 4th-place finish.

Thomas returned as a skip for the 2015-16 curling season, playing in two Grand Slam of Curling events that season and four more in the 2016-17 curling season (including playing third on Brad Gushue's team in one event, as Gushue was out due to a hip injury.

Personal life
Thomas is currently a student at the University of Calgary.

Awards
 Canadian Junior Men First Team All-star skip: 2006
 Canadian Junior Men First Team All-star skip: 2007

Grand Slam record

Notes

References

External links
 

1986 births
Living people
People from Didsbury, Alberta
Curlers from Victoria, British Columbia
Canadian male curlers
Canadian mixed doubles curling champions
Canadian curling coaches
Curlers from Calgary
Canada Cup (curling) participants